Allan Devanney (5 September 1941 – 1992) was an English professional footballer who played as a striker.

Career
Born in Otley, Devanney played for Bradford City and Guiseley.

References

1941 births
1992 deaths
English footballers
Bradford City A.F.C. players
Guiseley A.F.C. players
English Football League players
Association football forwards